The SR Z class was an 0-8-0T 3-cylinder tank engine designed by Richard Maunsell and intended for heavy shunting on the Southern Railway, the first eight entering into service in 1929. It was a successful design and would have been built in greater numbers, but an order for a further ten was cancelled in 1930 due to the reduction in freight traffic as a result of the Great Depression.

Background
The newly amalgamated Southern Railway needed a group of powerful shunting tank locomotives to work in its marshalling yards around London and on freight transfers between them. Robert Urie's G16 class 4-8-0 performed this task well, and further examples were on order in 1922, but Richard Maunsell considered the firebox to be too large and the superheater an unnecessary expense on such locomotives. He therefore cancelled the order in favour of a new design.

Due to the requirement for heavy shunting, the design was provided with an 0-8-0 wheel arrangement to increase traction, whilst enabling the locomotives to negotiate tight curves prevalent in goods yards. Another requirement was for the locomotive to be able to maintain power after long periods of standing idle, as freight marshalling was an intermittent duty. A  water capacity was also required to reduce the need for regular watering.

Construction history 
The new class was largely designed at Ashford railway works but, as a result of the unexpected need to redesign and rebuild the SECR K class locomotives at Ashford, Maunsell decided to construct the Z class at Brighton. One result of this change was that the boiler used was of an existing Brighton design, that of the D.E. Marsh C3 class. The resultant design was a three-cylinder locomotive that incorporated Walschaerts outside valve gear, controlling the outside cylinders, and custom-built inside gear controlling the central cylinder. The first of the class emerged from Brighton in March 1929 followed by the remainder over the next six months.

Steam and vacuum brakes, as well as steam heating were provided. This was to enable the locomotive to undertake the shunting of passenger stock should such a role be called for. A second batch of ten locomotives was planned to be constructed at Eastleigh, but the economic climate in 1931 meant that the order was scrapped. By the time trade recovered in the mid 1930s, Maunsell had begun experimenting in the use of diesel-electric shunting locomotives for these duties, and no further examples were built.

Operational details 
Throughout their working lives, the Z class locomotives remained in their role as heavy shunters in the larger marshalling yards at Feltham, Hither Green, Norwood Junction, Exmouth Junction and Eastleigh, and proved to be very popular with the locomotive crews until they were replaced by diesel shunters of the D3/13 class (later Class 12) in the early 1950s.

In December 1942 three of the class were loaned to the War Department, and saw service in Scotland where their abilities to move heavy freight were needed to move troop trains and war materials over winding routes. These were considered a rarity amongst locomotive crews, and due to the customised inside valve gear, the regulators worked in a different fashion to the norm, therefore causing problems amongst those unfamiliar with the design. They returned to the Southern Railway in May 1943.

As more diesel-electric shunters were delivered during the 1950s the class was gradually transferred to less demanding work at Brighton and Tonbridge freight yards. Towards the end of their working lives, the entire class was moved to the Western section of the BR Southern Region (BR(SR)), where their traction was put to good use in banking trains up the steep bank between Exeter St. David's and Exeter Central stations. However, with the reorganisation of the BR regions in 1962, the Western section of the BR(SR) came under the control of the BR Western Region (BR(WR)). As the Z class was not of a standard design under BR(WR) control, they were withdrawn throughout 1962, and banking duties were taken over by ex-GWR Pannier Tanks.

Livery and numbering

Southern
Livery was black, with yellow numbering and 'Southern' on the tank sides. As the class were built at Brighton the locomotives should logically have been allocated numbers in the ‘B’ (Brighton) series but they rather entered traffic as A950–A957 reflecting their Ashford origins. However, by the time of the 1931 renumbering scheme when Ashford locomotives had 1000 added to their numbers, the numbers 1950–1957 had already been allocated. The class were therefore numbered in the western section sequence 950–957.

Post-1948 (nationalisation)
Livery remained black in the guise of BR Freight Black, and the locomotives were provided with the BR crest on the tanks, whilst the numbering was located on the sides of the coal bunker. The Z class were given the numbers 30950–30957 under the BR standard numbering system.

Preservation attempt 
A private attempt was made in the 1960s to preserve a Z class, BR no 30952 with the intention to locate it on the Bluebell Railway in Sussex. The locomotive was withdrawn from service in November 1962 and stored in working order at Exmouth Junction locomotive shed until the Spring of 1963. It was then moved to Fratton MPD where it was stored for the remainder of 1963 and most of 1964. Eventually the preservation attempt failed, and the locomotive was on the scrap line at Eastleigh Works, with coupling rods removed and tied to one side, by October 1964. It was at Bristol (Barrow Road) MPD for a short period early in 1965 while on its way to South Wales for scrapping. It was cut up at Cashmores of Newport in May 1965.

Locomotive Summary

References

Notes

Bibliography

Further reading

External links 
30952, withdrawn, and en route to Cashmore's, Newport for scrapping - at Flickr
30952 on 1 January 1965, withdrawn and en route to Cashmore's, Newport, for scrapping - at Flickr

Z
0-8-0T locomotives
Railway locomotives introduced in 1929
Standard gauge steam locomotives of Great Britain
Scrapped locomotives
Shunting locomotives
Three-cylinder steam locomotives